Ingvar Gíslason (28 March 1926 – 17 August 2022) was an Icelandic politician, the minister of education, science and culture from 1980 to 1983 and a speaker of the lower house of the Althing.

He died on 17 August 2022, at the age of 96.

References

External links 
 Biography of Ingvar Gíslason on the parliament website  

1926 births
2022 deaths
Education ministers of Iceland
Government ministers of Iceland
Members of the Althing